State Road 615 (SR 615), locally known as 25th Street, is a  north–south commuter road serving St. Lucie County, Florida. Its northern terminus is an intersection with U.S. Route 1 (US 1 or SR 5) northeast of the St. Lucie County Airport in St. Lucie Village. SR 615 continues south along 25th Street, intersecting with Okeechobee Road (CR 770) and Virginia Avenue (SR 70) before the state road designation ends at its intersection with Edwards Road (CR 611). At Midway Road (CR 712), the road changes names from 25th Street to St. James Drive. After winding its way through northern Port St. Lucie, St. James Drive ends at an intersection with Airoso Boulevard, with the CR 615 designation continuing south along Airoso Boulevard. After intersections with Prima Vista Boulevard and Crosstown Parkway, CR 615 and Airoso Blvd. finally reaches its southern terminus with Port St. Lucie Blvd. (SR 716), where Port St. Lucie's City Hall is located.

No county route signage exists south of Edwards Road in Fort Pierce.

Major intersections

References

External links

FDOT Map of St. Lucie County (Including SR & CR 615)

615
615
615